The 1980–81 season was the 20th season of Club Universidad Nacional, commonly referred to as UNAM, in the top flight of Mexican football. In addition to the domestic league, UNAM participated in this season's editions of the CONCACAF Champions' Cup, and the Copa Interamericana.

Competitions

Overview

CONCACAF Champions' Cup

UNAM entered the tournament in the third round, after their opponent withdrew from the competition in the first round.

Third round

Final round

Copa Interamericana

Final

External links

Club Universidad Nacional seasons